Hamilton College is a liberal arts college in Clinton, New York, United States.

Hamilton College may also refer to:

 Hamilton and Alexandra College, in Hamilton, Australia
 Hamilton College, South Lanarkshire, a Christian independent school in Hamilton, United Kingdom
  Hamilton Literary & Theological Institution, a predecessor of Colgate University
 Hamilton Secondary College, in Mitchell Park, Australia
 Hamilton Technical College, a trade school in Davenport, United States
 Orchard Mead Academy, formerly Hamilton Community College, in Leicester, England
 Hamilton College, New York (CDP), census-designated place in New York state

Defunct institutions
 Hamilton University, in Evanston, United States
 Hamilton College, a former constituent college of McMaster University in Hamilton, Canada
 Hamilton College (Kentucky), a private women's school in Lexington, United States
 Hamilton College (Iowa), any of several for-profit schools in Iowa and Nebraska
 Royal Hamilton College of Music, in Hamilton, Canada